Westmorland is a civil parish in Westmorland County, New Brunswick, Canada.

For governance purposes it is divided between the village of Port Elgin and the local service districts of Baie-Verte, Pointe de Bute, and the parish of Westmorland.

All governance units are members of the Southeast Regional Service Commission.

Origin of name
Ganong considers the name to have "probably" come from Westmorland's proximity to Cumberland in England, or by the marshes in the English county.

Westmorland County was part of Cumberland County, Nova Scotia until New Brunswick was created, and Westmorland Parish was part of the Nova Scotia township of Cumberland.

History
Cumberland Township was organised in Nova Scotia in 1763.

Westmorland was erected as a parish in 1786 from the New Brunswick portion of Cumberland Township.

In 1880 the boundary with Sackville Parish was altered, transferring a large interior area to Sackville.

In 1894 the existing boundaries were declared retroactive to the parish's erection.

Boundaries
Westmorland Parish is bounded:

 on the northeast by a line running north 38º 30' west from the southeast angle of lot number one, granted to Otho Reed, at the mouth of Gaspereau Creek in Port Elgin;
 on the east by Baie Verte;
 on the southeast by the Nova Scotia border;
 on the southwest by Cumberland Basin;
 on the west and northwest by a line running up the Aulac River to the prolongation of Route 940 and Goose Creek Road, then by a line running northerly along the prolongation for about 4.3 kilometres, then running north 57º 30' east the channel of Big Jolicure Lake, then northeasterly to the mouth of Goose Creek, then up Goose Creek and Robinson Brook to a point about 300 metres south of Brooklyn Road and 300 metres west of Luciphy Road, then northeasterly about 3.6 kilometres to Brooklyn Road, then north 45º east to the starting point.

Communities
Communities at least partly within the parish; bold indicates an incorporated municipality

  Aulac
  Baie Verte
 Baie Verte Road
 Coburg
  Halls Hill
  Jolicure
  Mount Whatley
  Point de Bute
  Port Elgin
 Tidnish Bridge
 Uniacke Hill
  Upper Point de Bute

Bodies of water
Bodies of water at least partly in the parish:

 Aulac River
 La Coupe River
 Missaguash River
 Tidnish River
 Baie Verte Creek
 Goose Creek
 King Creek
 Otter Creek
 Baie Verte
 Big Jolicure Lake
 Dwyers Lake
 Jolicure Lake

Demographics
Parish population total does not include portion within Port Elgin

Population

Language
Mother tongue (2016)

Access routes
Highways and numbered routes that run through the parish, including external routes that start or finish at the parish limits:

Highways

Principal Routes
None
Secondary Routes:

External Routes:
None

See also
List of parishes in New Brunswick

Notes

References

Local service districts of Westmorland County, New Brunswick
Parishes of Westmorland County, New Brunswick